Marguerite Baulu  (1870, Brussels – 1942, Rambouillet) was a Belgian (French-language) novelist.

Biography
Baulu founded the Œuvre des fêtes dans les hôpitaux in 1908. In 1926 she was awarded an award by the Syndicat des romanciers français.

Bibliography
 L'Abbaye des dunes, Paris, Plon-Nourrit, 1914. 
 Boulle et sa fille, Paris, Plon-Nourrit, 1925. 
 Modeste automne, Paris, A. Leclerc, 1911.
 La bataille de l'Yser, republishes as  La retraite d'Anvers et la bataille de l'Yser, foreword by Émile Vandervelde, Paris, Perrin & Cie, 1918.

References 

 Notice de la BNF 

1870 births
1942 deaths
Belgian women novelists
Belgian writers in French
20th-century Belgian novelists
20th-century Belgian women writers
Writers from Brussels